Kalko's round-eared bat (Lophostoma kalkoae) is a species of leaf-nosed bat endemic to Panama.

Taxonomy and etymology
It was described as a new species in 2012 by  Paúl Velazco and Alfred Gardner. The holotype was collected in Soberanía National Park in Panama in October 1998. The specific epithet "kalkoae" is in honor of Elisabeth K. V. Kalko. Kalko had collected the holotype and the paratype for this species; Velazco and Gardner stated that she has "contributed in significant ways to the understanding of bat behavior and ecology worldwide."

Description
The fur on its back is long and dark brown, while the fur on its ventral side is white on the chest and pale brown on its sides.

Biology and ecology
Little is known about the biology of this species. A pregnant female was once documented in October.

Range and habitat
As of 2016, the species has not been documented outside of the type locality in Panama, Soberanía National Park.

Conservation
As of 2016, it is evaluated as a data deficient species by the IUCN. It meets the criteria for this classification because, as a recently described species, its ecology and natural history are not yet well-known.

References

Mammals described in 2012
Endemic fauna of Panama
Bats of Central America
Lophostoma